Adam Waczyński (born October 15, 1989) is a Polish professional basketball player for Baxi Manresa of the Liga ACB. He also represents the senior Polish national basketball team. He is a 1.99 m (6'6 ") tall shooting guard-small forward.

Professional career
In July 2016, he signed a three-year contract with the Spanish team Unicaja.

In the 2016–17 season, Waczyński won the EuroCup with Unicaja, after beating Valencia in the Finals. On July 17, 2020, he re-signed with Unicaja.

On September 9, 2021, Waczyński signed with Casademont Zaragoza of the Liga ACB.

National team career
Waczyński made his debut with the senior Polish national basketball team at EuroBasket 2011. He also played at the EuroBasket 2013, the EuroBasket 2015, and the EuroBasket 2017.

Career statistics

EuroLeague

|-
| style="text-align:left;"| 2007–08
| style="text-align:left;"| Prokom
| 2 || 0 || 6.1 || .400 || .000 || .000 || .5 || .0 || .0 || .0 || 2.0 || 1.5
|-
| style="text-align:left;"| 2017–18
| style="text-align:left;"| Unicaja
| 27 || 8 || 18.9 || .500 || .495 || .829 || 2.3 || 1.1 || .7 || .0 || 10.1 || 8.9
|- class="sortbottom"
| style="text-align:left;"| Career
| style="text-align:left;"|
| 29 || 8 || 18.0 || .497 || .490 || .829 || 2.2 || 1.1 || .7 || .0 || 9.5 || 8.4

National team

Honours and awards

Club
Prokom Trefl Sopot
Polish League Champion: 2004–05, 2007–08
Trefl Sopot
Polish Cup Winner: 2012, 2013
Polish Supercup Winner: 2012, 2013
Baloncesto Málaga
 EuroCup Champion: 2016–17

Individual
Polish League Most Improved Player: 2010–11
Polish Cup MVP: 2013

References

External links

 Adam Waczyński at acb.com 
 Adam Waczyński at draftexpress.com
 Adam Waczyński at euroleague.net
 Adam Waczyński at fiba.com
 

1989 births
Living people
2019 FIBA Basketball World Cup players
Baloncesto Málaga players
Basket Zaragoza players
Liga ACB players
Obradoiro CAB players
Polish expatriate basketball people in Spain
Polish men's basketball players
Shooting guards
Small forwards
Sportspeople from Toruń
Trefl Sopot players